Chanin Sae-ear (born 5 July 1992) is a Thai professional footballer who plays as a goalkeeper for Thai League 1 club Chonburi and the Thailand national team.

International career
Chanin played for the Thailand U-23 team at the 2014 Asian Games. He was also part of the senior squad at the 2014 AFF Suzuki Cup.

In May 2015, he was called up to play in a 2018 World Cup qualifying match against Vietnam.

Chanin was the starting keeper for Thailand at the 2015 Southeast Asian Games, conceding one goal in the whole tournament as Thailand won the gold medal.

Statistics

Honours

Club
Chonburi
 Thai FA Cup: Runner-up 2020–21
Sriracha
 Thai Division 1 League (1): 2010

International
Thailand U-23
 SEA Games  Gold Medal (2); 2013, 2015

Thailand 
 AFF Championship (2): 2014, 2016
 King's Cup (1): 2016

References

External links

1992 births
Living people
Chanin Sae-ear
Chanin Sae-ear
Chanin Sae-ear
Association football goalkeepers
Chanin Sae-ear
Chanin Sae-ear
Chanin Sae-ear
Chanin Sae-ear
Chanin Sae-ear
Chanin Sae-ear
Chanin Sae-ear
Chanin Sae-ear
Chanin Sae-ear
Chanin Sae-ear
Footballers at the 2014 Asian Games
Chanin Sae-ear
Southeast Asian Games medalists in football
Competitors at the 2013 Southeast Asian Games
Competitors at the 2015 Southeast Asian Games
Chanin Sae-ear